Jakub Podaný (born 15 June 1987) is a former Czech football player who last played for Jablonec. He played 11 matches and scored two goals for Indian Super League team Atlético de Kolkata in 2014.

Honours
Atlético de Kolkata
 Indian Super League: 2014

Slovan Bratislava
 Slovak Cup Runner-up: 2015–16

References

External links
 
 
 Eurofotbal profile

1987 births
Living people
Association football wingers
Czech footballers
Czech expatriate footballers
Czech First League players
Czech National Football League players
Slovak Super Liga players
Indian Super League players
FK Bohemians Prague (Střížkov) players
AC Sparta Prague players
SK Sigma Olomouc players
FK Senica players
FK Teplice players
ATK (football club) players
ŠK Slovan Bratislava players
FK Dukla Prague players
Bohemians 1905 players
Czech expatriate sportspeople in Slovakia
Czech expatriate sportspeople in India
Expatriate footballers in Slovakia
Expatriate footballers in India
Sportspeople from Přerov
FK Jablonec players